Ammophila (synonymous with Psamma P. Beauv.) is a genus of flowering plants consisting of two or three very similar species of grasses. The common names for these grasses include marram grass, bent grass, and beachgrass. These grasses are found almost exclusively on the first line of coastal sand dunes. Their extensive systems of creeping underground stems or rhizomes allow them to thrive under conditions of shifting sands and high winds, and to help stabilize and prevent coastal erosion. Ammophila species are native to the coasts of the North Atlantic Ocean where they are usually the dominant species on sand dunes. Their native range includes few inland regions, with the Great Lakes of North America being the main exception. The genus name Ammophila originates from the Greek words ἄμμος (ámmos), meaning "sand", and φίλος (philos), meaning "friend".

The Ammophila grasses are widely known as examples of xerophytes, plants that can withstand dry conditions. Despite their occurrence on seacoasts, Ammophila grasses are not particularly tolerant of saline soils; they can tolerate a salinity of about 15 g/L (1.5%), which makes them "moderate halophytes".

Ammophila builds coastal sand dunes and thus stabilizes the sand. For this reason, the plants are seen as a useful means of reinforcing sand dunes around the world, and have been introduced far from their native range. Alfred Wiedemann writes that Ammophila arenaria, the European species, "has been introduced into virtually every British colonial settlement within its latitudinal tolerance range, including southeast and southwest Australia, New Zealand, South Africa, the Falkland Islands, and Norfolk Island and has been reported from Argentina and Chile." Ammophila species were introduced in the late 19th century on the Pacific coast of North America as well, and massive, intentional plantings were continued at least through 1960. In essentially all of the locations where they have been introduced, Ammophila plants are now listed as invasive, and costly efforts are underway to eradicate them.

Species 
Only two species seem incontrovertible: A. arenaria and A. breviligulata. Two other species have been proposed, and are discussed below.
 A. arenaria - European marram grass or European beachgrass. Native to coasts of Europe (north to Iceland) and northwest Africa. Inflorescence to 25 cm long; broad.
 A. baltica - Purple marram. A. baltica has now been identified as a hybrid between A. arenaria and Calamagrostis epigejos. The hybrid occurs in parts of northern Europe, mainly from the Baltic Sea west to eastern England, and is known as × Ammocalamagrostis baltica or × Calammophila baltica.
 A. breviligulata - American marram grass or American beachgrass. Native to coasts of eastern North America, including the shores of the Great Lakes. Inflorescence to 30 cm long; narrower than A. arenaria.
 A. champlainensis or A. breviligulata ssp. champlainensis - Champlain beachgrass. Native to shores of Lake Ontario and Lake Champlain. Inflorescence to 22 cm long; very similar to A. breviligulata, and no longer considered a distinct species by several authorities.

Ecology 

In Europe, Ammophila arenaria has a coastal distribution, and is the dominant species on sand dunes where it is responsible for stabilising and building the foredune by capturing blown sand and binding it together with the warp and weft of its tough, fibrous rhizome system.  Marram grass is strongly associated with two coastal plant community types in the British National Vegetation Classification. In community SD6 (Mobile dune) Ammophila is the dominant species. In the semi-fixed dunes (community SD7), where the quantity of blown sand is declining Ammophila becomes less competitive, and other species, notably  Festuca rubra (red fescue) become prominent.

Uses 
The ability of marram grass to grow on and bind sand makes it a useful plant in the stabilization of coastal dunes and artificial defences on sandy coasts. The usefulness was recognized in the late 18th century. On the North Sea coast of Jutland,
Denmark, marram grass was traditionally much used for fuel, thatch, cattle fodder (after frost) etc. The use led to sand drift and loss of arable land. Hence, legislation promoting dune stabilization came into force in 1779 and 1792, successively leading to a system of state-supported dune planters overlooked by dune bailiffs. Marram grass was – and still is – propagated by root and shoot cuttings dug up locally and planted into the naked sand in periods of relatively calm and moist weather.

Women from the village of Newborough, Anglesey, Wales once used marram grass in the manufacture of mats, haystack covers and brushes for whitewashing.

Marram grass has been widely used for thatch in many areas of the British Isles close to the sea. The harvesting of marram grass for thatch was so widespread during the 17th century that it had the effect of destabilizing dunes, resulting in the burial of many villages, estates and farms. In 1695 the practice was banned by an Act of the Scottish Parliament:

Adaptations 

Like other xerophytes, marram grass is well adapted to its surroundings in order to thrive in an otherwise harsh environment. The natural loss of water through transpiration is not desirable in a very dry landscape, and marram grass has developed particular adaptations to help it deal with this. Sandy conditions drain water quickly, and very windy conditions will further increase rates of transpiration.

Marram grass has a rolled leaf that creates a localized environment of water vapour concentration within the leaf, and helps to prevent water loss. The stomata sit in small pits within the curls of the structure, which make them less likely to open and to lose water. The folded leaves have hairs on the inside to slow or stop air movement, much like many other xerophytes (though these are typically found on the outside of the plant, but in marram grass they are also within the leaf as this has now become a structure with more volume). This slowing of air movement once again reduces the amount of water vapour being lost. A waxy cuticle on the leaf surface also prevents evaporation.

See also 
 List of Poaceae genera

References

External links 
 
 [http://www.ccc.ca.gov California Conservation Corps], spearhead of Ammophila'' removal efforts in California.
 Jepson Manual Treatment

Pooideae
Flora of the Great Lakes region (North America)
Poaceae genera